José Martins da Silva (June 14, 1936 – January 29, 2015) was a Roman Catholic archbishop.

Ordained to the priesthood in 1963, Martins da Silva was named bishop in 1978 and then Archbishop of Porto Velho, Brazil in 1982 and resigned in 1997.

Notes

1936 births
2015 deaths
20th-century Roman Catholic archbishops in Brazil
Roman Catholic archbishops of Porto Velho
Roman Catholic bishops of Ji-Paraná